The Queen's Award for Enterprise: International Trade (Export) (2007) was awarded on 21 April 2007, by Queen Elizabeth II.

Recipients
The following organisations were awarded this year.

 4i2i Communications Ltd of Aberdeen, Scotland for software and semiconductor designs.
 The Aerogen Company Limited of Alton, Hampshire for industrial gas burner systems.
 Americhem Europe Limited of Manchester for colour additive concentrates for the thermoplastic industry.
 The Association of London WC2 for professional examinations and membership
 Avon Metals Limited of Gloucester for aluminium alloys.
 Beardow & Adams (Adhesives) Ltd of Milton Keynes for hot melt adhesives.
 Bridgehead International Limited of Melton Mowbray, for biopharmaceutical consultancy services.
 CWC Group Limited of London SW11 for international conferences, exhibitions and training.
 Cement Performance International Limited of Rochester, Kent for technical consultancy to the cement industry.
 Clyde & Co of London EC3 for legal services.
 Coaltrans Conferences Limited of London EC4 for international conferences, exhibitions, training, workshops and field trips.
 Cobham Defence Communications Ltd of Blackburn, Lancashire for intercom systems for high noise platforms.
 Coombe Castle International Ltd of Corsham, Wiltshire for cheese, butter and cream.
 Cummins Ltd, Daventry Plant of Daventry for high horsepower diesel and gas engines
 The Davy Roll Company Ltd of Gateshead, Tyne and Wear for cast rolls for the metal forming industries.
 Dunn Brothers (1995) Ltd of Smethwick, West Midlands for scrap metal recycling.
 EMB Consultancy LLP of Epsom, Surrey for actuarial advice to insurers, re-insurers and regulators, and actuarial software supply.
 ETL Systems Limited of Madley, Herefordshire for radio frequency equipment for satellite ground stations.
 ECOSYL Products Ltd of Stokesley, North Yorkshire for biological inoculants.
 Edinburgh Military Tattoo of Edinburgh, Scotland for a unique blend of music, ceremony and entertainment
 Extec Screens & Crushers Ltd of Swadlincote, Derbyshire for screening and crushing equipment.
 FT Technologies Ltd of Teddington, Middlesex for wind and airflow sensors, featuring patented acoustic resonance technology.
 FTC Kaplan Ltd of London SE1 for financial and business training services.
 Farécla Products Limited of Ware, Hertfordshire for specialist abrasive polishes for the vehicle repair industry.
 Fibercore Limited of Southampton, Hampshire for optical fibres.
 Giram UK Limited (trading as Q’Straint) Whitstable, Kent for wheelchair restraint systems.
 Grainger & Worrall Ltd of Bridgnorth, Shropshire for specialist castings for the automotive, motorsport, aerospace and defence industries.
 Helical Technology Limited of Lytham St. Annes, Lancashire for actuators for automotive turbochargers and valve  rotators for large industrial engines.
 Horizon Global Electronics Ltd of Enfield, Middlesex for hand held test equipment for the digital/satellite sector.
 Hyperion Insurance Group Limited of London EC3 for insurance services.
 Imaginatik PLC of Winchester, Hampshire for software development.
 Inspecs Limited of Bath, Somerset for spectacle and sunglass frames.
 International Transmissions Ltd of Wrexham, Wales for integrated drivelines, powertrains, transmission and axle assemblies for on/off highway vehicles.
 JCB Compact Products Ltd of Cheadle, Staffordshire for small construction, industrial and agricultural equipment.
 JCB Materials Handling Ltd of Uttoxeter, Staffordshire for telescopic materials handlers.
 Joy Mining Machinery Limited of Worcester for underground mining machinery.
 Kronsten & Co of Twyford, Berkshire for aircraft spare parts and de/anti-icing fluid.
 L.E.K. Consulting of London SW1 for management consulting.
 Lavenham Leisure Ltd of Sudbury, Suffolk for horse rugs and quilted jackets.
 Leeson Polyurethanes Ltd of Warwick for polyurethane formulated chemicals.
 Link Project Services Ltd of Newton-le-Willows, Merseyside for project and operations management, engineers and support personnel for the oil and gas industry.
 Link Research Ltd of Watford, Hertfordshire for television encoders and modulators and digital wireless camera systems.
 Metal Interests Ltd of Chichester, West Sussex for non-ferrous metal recycling.
 Metryx Ltd of Nailsea, Bristol for metrology tools to the semiconductor industry.
 Herman Miller Limited of Chippenham, Wiltshire for office furniture.
 Mondrian Investment Partners Limited of London EC2 for investment management.
 Monsoon PLC of London W2 for fashion garments and accessories.
 NES Group Ltd of Altrincham, Cheshire for specialist technical and engineering recruitment company.
 Neogen Europe Ltd of Auchincruive, Ayr, for diagnostic kits for food safety testing.
 Networkers International (UK) plc of Beckenham, Kent Recruitment of technical personnel to the international for iCT marketplace.
 Next Generation Security Software Ltd of Sutton, Surrey for internet security software and consultancy services.
 Omega Foundry Machinery Limited of Orton Southgate, for foundry machinery and recycling systems.
 Optos Plc of Dunfermline, Scotland for scanning laser ophthalmoscopes capturing over 80% of the retina.
 Peak Scientific Instruments Ltd of Inchinnan, Renfrew, for gas generators.
 Portpack UK Limited of Hucknall, Nottingham for containerised mobile weighing and bagging plants and fixed plants for internal bagging applications.
 Precision Polymer Engineering Limited of Blackburn, Lancashire High performance sealing solutions.
 QRG Limited (trading as Quantum Research Group) of Southampton, Hampshire for electronic touch sensor chips and technology licensing for control surfaces of consumer electronic products.
 Racelogic Ltd of Buckingham for high accuracy GPS systems for automotive testing.
 Randox Laboratories Ltd of Crumlin, County Antrim, Northern Ireland for diagnostic kits for medical, veterinary and environmental monitoring
 Felix Rosenstiel’s Widow & Son Ltd of London SW3 for unframed reproduction art prints and posters.
 Routes Limited of Manchester for airline and airport air service development forums.
 SPI (Materials) Limited of Tamworth, Staffordshire for stainless steel tubing.
 Stephenson Group Limited of Bradford, West Yorkshire for speciality chemicals.
 Sunseeker International Limited of Poole, Dorset for luxury motor yachts.
 Titan Steel Wheels Limited of Kidderminster, Worcestershire for wheels for earthmoving machines, mobile cranes and dockside vehicles.
 United Corporation Ltd of Wallington, Surrey for spare parts and equipment to the oil and gas industries.
 Witherbys Publishing Ltd of London EC1 for shipping and insurance manuals and textbooks.
 John Wood Group PLC of Aberdeen, Scotland for international energy services to the oil and gas, and power generation industries.
 Wood Mackenzie Limited of Edinburgh, Scotland for energy and metals research and consultancy.
 Yamazaki Mazak U.K. Limited of Worcester for computer controlled machine tools.

References

Queen's Award for Enterprise: International Trade (Export)
2007 in the United Kingdom